The 2017 Senior League World Series took place from July 29–August 5  in Easley, South Carolina, United States. Aguadulce, Panama defeated Coral Springs, Florida in the championship game. This was the first SLWS held in Easley.

The debut of the Australia and Caribbean regions created a change in format. For the first time ever, teams were placed into two geographic-based brackets (U.S. and International).

Teams

Results

United States Bracket

International Bracket

Consolation round

Elimination Round

References

Senior League World Series
Senior League World Series
Senior
Senior League
Sports competitions in South Carolina